Dolioponera is a genus of small ants in the subfamily Ponerinae containing the single species Dolioponera fustigera. The genus is known only from a few specimens from west and central Africa. Little is known about their biology, and males remain unknown.

References

External links

Ponerinae
Monotypic ant genera
Hymenoptera of Africa